Hanoi Radio Television, officially Hanoi Radio & Television Broadcasting, is the official radio and television network of Hanoi, Vietnam. Its headquarters is on Huỳnh Thúc Kháng Boulevard, Đống Đa District, which represents its network logo. 
It currently own 3 radio channels and 2 television channels:
Hanoi Radio: the first broadcast channel of the network, broadcast in the frequency of FM 90.0 MHz.
Hanoi Radio 2: the news and entertainment channel, merged from ex-Ha Tay province radio station, broadcast in the frequency of FM 96.0 MHz.
Hanoi Radio 3 - Joy FM: leisure-themed channel, on-air since 2012, broadcast in the frequency of FM 98.9 MHz; currently airing On365FM, a transportative information radio system operated by VTVcab.
H1: Hanoi TV 1, previously H, originally the network's sole televised channel. It was modified as a news and social channel after the installment of H2.
H2: Hanoi TV 2, previously HTV (not to be confused with Ho Chi Minh City Television). It changed its name after the 2008 geographical merge of Hà Tây Province into Hanoi. It now serves as an entertainment and financial channel.
Hanoi Cable Network Television (Hanoicab), a cable network.

History
On 14 October 1954, the Hanoi Radio commenced broadcasting for the first time.
On January 6, 1978, Hanoi People's Committee decided the 41/QDTC to Hanoi Radio open the Television service. The television service launched on 1 January 1979 at 14:00 (UTC+07:00). Originally, it is the 45 minutes programmes block on VTV1 (channel 6 VHF). It later became sole television channel, broadcast on channel 6, VHF, replaced VTV3 (at that time VTV3 was aired on channel 6 VHF, later it moved to channel 22 UHF).

Throughout the times, the Hanoian television channel increases the broadcasting times.

Since 1 August 2008, following the merger of Ha Tay Province into Hanoi region and the dissolved of Ha Tay radio & television station, Hanoi Television expanded into two television channels. The radio frequency of Ha Tay radio station was also merged with Hanoi Radio & Television.

In 2013, Hanoi Television launched the third channel, H3, on channel 49 UHF, broadcasting only in Hanoi. However, this channel only relay programs from H1. The exact time to stop broadcasting H3 is unknown.

From 2010 to 2016, Hanoi Television broadcast live several matches of English Premier League and German Bundesliga on both H1 and H2, along with several Vietnamese subscription networks. Also from 2016, H1 expanded the broadcast times to 24 hours per day, following by H2 on the year after.

Since 1 January 2019, following the contractual partnership with The Voice of Ho Chi Minh City (VOH), Hanoi Radio begun to air selected programmes from VOH stations which currently broadcasting on the original frequencies of 99.9 MHz and 96.5 MHz.

See also
Telecommunications in Vietnam
List of radio stations in Vietnam
List of television channels in Vietnam
List of dramas broadcast by Hanoi Radio Television (HanoiTV)
List of programmes broadcast by Hanoi Radio Television

References

External links
 Hanoi Radio Television Official Site

Television companies of Vietnam
Radio stations in Vietnam
Television channels and stations established in 1954
Mass media in Hanoi
Television networks in Vietnam